Dedrick Allen Dodge (born June 14, 1967), is a former American football safety and currently the Safties coach at Grambling State University. He played college football at Florida State University and in eight seasons in the National Football League (NFL), from 1991 to 1998. He is a two time Super Bowl champion. He played in Super Bowl XXIX for the San Francisco 49ers and in Super Bowl XXXII for the Denver Broncos. He also played for the London Monarchs in the inaugural season of the World League of American Football; London won the first World Bowl that year, meaning that Dodge has three pro football championship rings.

Dodge played high school football at East Brunswick High School in East Brunswick, New Jersey and Mulberry High School in Mulberry, Florida.

Dodge spent two seasons as the head football coach at Mulberry Senior High School. According to The Ledger of Lakeland, Dodge previously coached a year at Evangel Christian in Lakeland, Florida, leading the team to an 11–3 record and a state title in 2005. He then coached a year at Victory Christian after Evangel folded and led the Storm to a 10–4 record with some of Evangel's former players.

Victory finished state runner-up in 2005, losing to Tallahassee FAMU in the 1B state title game.
Dodge has returned to his home in Locust Grove, Georgia, about 30 miles south of Atlanta, where he maintained a home in Georgia since 2007 after he began coaching at Fort Valley State University as an assistant.  Dodge previously coached in Polk County at Victory Christian, Mulberry and Evangel Christian, where he won a state title in 2005.

References

1967 births
Living people
American football safeties
Denver Broncos players
Florida State Seminoles football players
London Monarchs players
San Diego Chargers players
San Francisco 49ers players
Seattle Seahawks players
High school football coaches in Florida
East Brunswick High School alumni
Mulberry High School (Mulberry, Florida) alumni
People from East Brunswick, New Jersey
People from Mulberry, Florida
People from Neptune Township, New Jersey
Sportspeople from Middlesex County, New Jersey
Players of American football from Florida
Players of American football from New Jersey
African-American coaches of American football
African-American players of American football
21st-century African-American people
20th-century African-American sportspeople